Bessie Craigmyle (1863–1933) was a Scottish poet who lived in Aberdeen.

Bessie was the daughter of an elderly schoolmaster, who retired when she was still a child. He was able to devote his energies to her education, providing an extensive library and a number of greenhouses in the family home for her use.

After qualifying as school teacher, she taught in the Dr Williams School, Dolgellau, which was a pioneering secondary school for girls.

She was brought up in the Presbyterian faith but came to question this as a teenager. At this time she met Margaret Dale, another daughter of a schoolmaster. They became close friends, but Bessie wanted more from the relationship. They shared an ambition to become doctors, and Dale accepted a well-paid job at St. Andrew's Scots School, Buenos Aires. While in Argentina she was engaged to be married, but then died. When news of this reached Craigmyle, she suffered from a breakdown. Following an accident on the 46th anniversary of Margaret's death in 1933 Bessie herself died.

Works
 Poems and Translations 1886
 A Handful of Pansies 1888

References

1863 births
1933 deaths
Scottish women poets
Scottish LGBT poets